is a Japanese politician of the Kokumin Ikari no Koe who served in the House of Councillors from 1993 to 2010.

Madoka was born in Yokosuka, Kanagawa and grew up in Yao, Osaka and Takamatsu, Kagawa. She graduated from Tsuda College in 1969, and worked in the editorial department of the English-language newspaper The Japan Times and as a freelance journalist and author, particularly focusing on women and family issues. Her efforts also made her prominent as a television commentator.

She ran unsuccessfully in the 1992 House of Councillors election as a proportional representation candidate from the Japan New Party. After three members resigned from the House to run in the 1993 general election, Madoka was elected to fill one of the open seats (that of Yuriko Koike). She subsequently stayed alongside JNP head Morihiro Hosokawa as part of the "From Five" group with Shinji Tarutoko, Kiyoshi Ueda and Takenori Emoto, moving alongside them to the Good Governance Party and finally the Democratic Party of Japan in 1998. Madoka was elected as a DPJ candidate in the 1998 election and 2004 election, but lost her seat in the 2010 election. In 1999, she became the first member of the House of Councillors to give a speech longer than three hours when she spoke against the enactment of a telecommunications interception statute.

After leaving the House of Councillors, she unsuccessfully ran in the 2012 general election for the Tokyo 8th district seat in the House of Representatives, losing to Nobuteru Ishihara and second-ranked Tarō Yamamoto. She was also a proportional representation candidate in the 2013 House of Councillors election but was ranked fifteenth out of twenty DPJ candidates and failed to win one of the seven PR seats won by the party.

She served as a policy advisor to Morihiro Hosokawa during the 2014 Tokyo gubernatorial election.

In 2016, she unsuccessfully ran once again for a National PR block seat in the House of Councillors as a member of the Angry Voice of the Citizens party.

References

External links 
  in Japanese

Female members of the House of Councillors (Japan)
Members of the House of Councillors (Japan)
People from Yokosuka, Kanagawa
1947 births
Living people
Democratic Party of Japan politicians
Tsuda University alumni